Sebastian Denius Nielsen (born 8 June 1995) is a Danish professional footballer plays as an attacking midfielder for Kolding IF.

Career
Denius moved from Kjellerup to Skive in July 2018, and to Kolding in July 2022. In January 2023, Kolding confirmed that Denius would also take on the role of transition coach, while remaining a player at the club.

References

1995 births
Living people
Danish men's footballers
Viborg FF players
Danish Superliga players
Danish 1st Division players
Danish 2nd Division players
Association football midfielders
Kjellerup IF players
Skive IK players
Kolding IF players